Manuel Crescencio Rejón International Airport, formerly known as Mérida-Rejón Airport  is an international airport located in the Mexican city of Mérida, Yucatán. It is located on the southern edge of the city and it is one of four airports in Mexico which has an Area Control Center 
(Centro Mérida/Mérida Center); the other ones being Mexico City International Airport, Monterrey International Airport, and Mazatlán International Airport. Mérida Center controls air traffic over the southeast part of the country, largely traffic going from Central America, South America, and the Caribbean to the United States and Canada.

It handles both domestic and international flights, and is open 24 hours a day. It can service airplanes as large as Boeing 747s and 777s, though most planes flying daily are smaller, the most common being the Boeing 737 and Airbus A320.

Information
The airport was completely remodeled between 1999 and 2001. It is the second largest airport in the ASUR's (Grupo Aeroportuario del Sureste) group in terms of passengers and the first in terms of cargo.

There are multiple duty-free stores, a food court, specialty stores, bank and car rental counters in the terminal. 24 hour medical services and tourist information booths are also available.

A Mexican Air Force Base −8th BAM, is located at the premises to the left of runway 10.

In 2021 it handled 2,079,503 passengers, and in 2022, 3,079,618 passengers passed through Mérida International Airport according to Grupo Aeroportuario del Sureste.

The airport has exclusive VIP lounges for Aeroméxico Salón Premier, and the Caral VIP Lounge.

Airlines and destinations

Passenger

Cargo

Statistics

Busiest routes

Accidents and incidents
On 9 April 1958, a Vickers Viscount of Cubana de Aviación was hijacked en route from José Martí International Airport, Havana, to Santa Clara Airport. The aircraft landed at Mérida-Rejón Airport, Mexico, where the hijack ended.

See also

Busiest airports in Mexico 
List of the busiest airports in Mexico

References

External links
 Mérida Intl. Airport

Airports in Yucatán
Mérida, Yucatán
WAAS reference stations